Edythe Elliott (born Edythe Fletcher) was an American character actress active primarily during the 1930s, 1940s, and 1950s.

Biography 
Edythe Elliott was born in San Francisco, California where her parents were involved in Vaudeville. 

In 1917, Elliott became the leading lady of the stock company at the Wigwam Theatre in San Francisco. On Broadway, she portrayed Pansy Horner in Salt Water (1929), Florence Blandy in After Tomorrow (1931), and Mrs. Thomas Carter in Mother Lode (1934). She developed a prominent career on the stage before moving to the screen. She married fellow actor Charles "Royal" Elliott in Oregon in 1906 in a ceremony performed before a large audience.

Elliott debuted in films in 1935.

Selected filmography 

Show Them No Mercy! (1935) - Mrs. Hansen
I Married a Doctor (1936) - Mrs. Clark
The Girl on the Front Page (1936) - Mrs. Stokes (uncredited)
Stella Dallas (1937) - Department Store Clerk (uncredited)
Crashing Hollywood (1938) - Barbara's Landlady (uncredited)
Double Danger (1938) - Mrs. Edith Theron
Condemned Women (1938) - Dr. Barnes (uncredited)
Fixer Dugan (1939) - Mrs. Fletcher
The Rookie Cop (1939) - Mrs. Maitland (uncredited)
Bachelor Mother (1939) - Minor Role (uncredited)
Dancing Co-Ed (1939) - Housemother Listening to Beethoven (uncredited)
Beware Spooks! (1939) - Woman Radio Announcer (uncredited)
Gone with the Wind (1939) - General's Wife (uncredited)
Nobody's Children (1940) - Mrs. King (uncredited)
Blondie in Society (1941) - Angry Neighbor Who Had a Birthday Cake (uncredited)
The Medico of Painted Springs (1941) - Maw Blaine
The Richest Man in Town (1941) - Elderly Woman (uncredited)
The Iron Claw (1941, Serial) - Milly Leach
Father Takes a Wife (1941) - Mrs. Plant, at Wedding (uncredited)
Harmon of Michigan (1941) - Mrs. Davis (uncredited)
The Stork Pays Off (1941) - Mrs. Gadsby (uncredited)
The Power of God (1942) - Mrs. Gilder
The Man Who Returned to Life (1942) - Mrs. Turner (uncredited)
Bullets for Bandits (1942) - Queen Katey
Flight Lieutenant (1942) - Mrs. Edythe Rhodes (uncredited)
Blondie for Victory (1942) - Housewife of America (uncredited)
Stand By All Networks (1942) - Mrs. Elliott (uncredited)
Valley of Hunted Men (1942) - Elisabeth Schiller
Lucky Jordan (1942) - 2nd Secretary (uncredited)
Junior Army (1942) - Mrs. Pamela Ferguson (uncredited)
Redhead from Manhattan (1943) - Nurse (uncredited)
The Seventh Victim (1943) - Mrs. Swift (uncredited)
Gangway for Tomorrow (1943) - Mary's Mother (uncredited)
The Song of Bernadette (1943) - Townswoman (uncredited)
Cowboy Canteen (1944) - Mrs. Bradley (uncredited)
Casanova in Burlesque (1944) - Audience Member (uncredited)
Stars on Parade (1944) - Mrs. Dean
One Mysterious Night (1944) - Mother (uncredited)
End of the Road (1944) - Middle-Aged Woman (uncredited)
The Great Mike (1944) - Mrs. Dolan
Let's Go Steady (1945) - Mrs. Pugg (uncredited)
A Tree Grows in Brooklyn (1945) - Nurse (uncredited)
The Power of the Whistler (1945) - Mrs. Crawford (uncredited)
The Phantom of 42nd Street (1945) - Janis Buchanan
Scotland Yard Investigator (1945) - Mrs. Brent (uncredited)
Girls of the Big House (1945) - Postmistress (uncredited)
Dick Tracy (1945) - Mrs. Caraway (uncredited)
Life with Blondie (1945) - Minor Role (uncredited)
The Madonna's Secret (1946) - Landlady (uncredited)
The Undercover Woman (1946) - Mrs. Grey
Freddie Steps Out (1946) - Mrs. Rogers
Personality Kid (1946) - Mrs. Howard
High School Hero (1946) - Mrs. Rogers
Santa Fe Uprising (1946) - Mrs. Dibble
Ginger (1946) - Mom Sullivan
That Brennan Girl (1946) - Miss Unity, Jane's Sister
Vacation Days (1947) - Mrs. Rogers
Homesteaders of Paradise Valley (1947) - Mrs. Hume
Web of Danger (1947) - Mrs. Mason - Red Cross Worker (uncredited)
The Son of Rusty (1947) - Mrs. Hebble (uncredited)
Messenger of Peace (1947) - Hilda Torgel
The Fabulous Texan (1947) - Texas Woman (uncredited)
Her Husband's Affairs (1947) - Nurse (uncredited)
The Bishop's Wife (1947) - Saleslady (uncredited)
The Lady from Shanghai (1947) - Old Lady (uncredited)
House by the River (1950) - Minor Role (uncredited)
Kill the Umpire (1950) - Elderly Woman (uncredited)
The Killer That Stalked New York (1950) - Nurse (uncredited)
Hit Parade of 1951 (1950) - Minor Role (uncredited)
Belle Le Grand (1951) - Miner's Wife (uncredited)
All That I Have (1951) - Juror Mrs. Burton (uncredited)
Rose of Cimarron (1952) - Townswoman (uncredited)
Rainbow 'Round My Shoulder (1952) - Mrs. Gilmore (uncredited)

References

External links

20th-century American actresses
American film actresses
Actresses from San Francisco
1886 births
1978 deaths
American stage actresses
Broadway theatre people